The Gau Cologne-Aachen (German: Gau Köln-Aachen) was an administrative division of Nazi Germany from 1933 to 1945 in the north-central part of the Prussian Rhine Province. Before that, from 1931 to 1933, it was the regional subdivision of the Nazi Party in that area.

History
The Nazi Gau (plural Gaue) system was originally established in a party conference on 22 May 1926, in order to improve administration of the party structure. From 1933 onwards, after the Nazi seizure of power, the Gaue increasingly replaced the German states as administrative subdivisions in Germany.

At the head of each Gau stood a Gauleiter, a position which became increasingly more powerful, especially after the outbreak of the Second World War, with little interference from above. Local Gauleiters often held government positions as well as party ones and were in charge of, among other things, propaganda and surveillance and, from September 1944 onward, the Volkssturm and the defense of the Gau.

The position of Gauleiter in Cologne-Aachen was held by Josef Grohé throughout the history of the Gau. Grohé made a suicide attempt at the end of the war, escaped under a false name, was arrested in 1946 and sentenced to four and a half years in prison but never repented his views and died in 1987.

The Gau had a size of 7,100 km2 (2,741 sq mi) and a population of 2,300,000, which placed it in mid-table for size and population in the list of Gaue.

References

External links
 Illustrated list of Gauleiter

1931 establishments in Germany
1945 disestablishments in Germany
Aachen
History of Cologne
Rhine Province under Nazi rule